In taxonomy, Cenarchaeum is a genus of the Cenarchaeaceae. The marine archaean Cenarchaeum symbiosum lives within (it is an endosymbiont of) the sponge Axinella mexicana.

References

Further reading

Scientific journals

Scientific books

Scientific databases

External links

Archaea genera
Thermoproteota